The Afterman: Descension is the seventh studio album by progressive rock band Coheed and Cambria. It is the second part of a double album, the first part of which is The Afterman: Ascension. The band took seven months to record the albums between 2011 and 2012, and announced a February 5, 2013 release date.

The deluxe version of the album was released with a coffee-table book co-written by band member Claudio Sanchez and writer Peter David, giving a song-by-song experience of the concept album. The album follows the Amory Wars storyline, and concentrates on the character Sirius Amory.

Background and recording

Coheed and Cambria began recording the double album in November 2011, and had finished recording by June 2012.

"Iron Fist" was debuted in 2010. The song was also featured in the acoustic set during their "Neverender: Second Stage Turbine Blade" dates in 2011.

In February, 2012, Coheed and Cambria singer/guitarist Claudio Sanchez released a self-shot acoustic rendition of a new song titled "Sentry the Defiant" (later retitled "Key Entity Extraction V: Sentry The Defiant") via the band's official YouTube channel.

Release

The album was released in both digital and physical formats on February 5, 2013; the first part (The Afterman: Ascension) was released on 9 October 2012. The album name and release date were announced on July 31, 2012 via a press release and a YouTube teaser video, featuring a man in a spaceship speaking to an AI he refers to as "All Mother". Coheed and Cambria co-produced the album with Michael Birnbaum and Chris Bittner under the label Hundred Handed/Everything Evil and will be distributed by Fontana/INgrooves.

The deluxe version of the album was released with a hardcover coffee-table book of the album's Amory Wars storyline, the concept all Coheed and Cambria's albums follow (with the exception of 2015's The Color Before the Sun). The book is co-written by Sanchez and writer Peter David, who worked together on the book which accompanied Coheed and Cambria's previous album, Year of the Black Rainbow. The double album tells the story of Sirius Amory, the namesake of the concept, as he explores the energy source holding together the Keywork (the 78 worlds in which the Amory Wars is set) and finds that it is in fact a horrible afterlife for departed souls. The artwork for the book was created by Heidi Taillefer and Nathan Spoor, and the book provides a "song-by-song" experience for the listener.

The song "The Hard Sell" was released on December 18, 2012 as part of Guitar Center's Fresh Cuts Vol. 8 compilation CD. A lyric video of the song was later put on the band's official YouTube channel. "Dark Side of Me" was later released on January 14, 2013, along with a lyric video, on the band's Facebook page. The band also played the song on the January 21 episode of Conan. Similarly, "Number City" was released exclusively on NME.com on January 30, 2013, and "Iron Fist" was released on the official Coheed and Cambria Tumblr Account the following day.

Reception

Critical
The album was met with generally positive reviews. It has received 4/5 ratings from Allmusic, Alternative Press, Kerrang! and musicOMH. The overall rating on Metacritic is 75/100.

Commercial

The Afterman: Descension debuted at  No. 9 on the Billboard 200 albums chart on its release, selling around 41,000 copies in the United States in its first week. It also debuted at No. 3 on both the Billboard's Top Rock Albums and Alternative Albums charts. The album has sold 91,600 copies in the United States as of October 2015.

The album debuted at number 64 on the UK Albums Chart and number 3 on the UK Rock Albums Chart.

Track listing

Personnel

Coheed and Cambria
Claudio Sanchez – lead vocals, rhythm guitar, piano, ukulele, voice of Sirius Amory
Travis Stever – lead guitar, lap steel guitar, backing vocals
Josh Eppard – drums, percussion, keyboards, backing vocals
Zach Cooper – bass, backing vocals

Additional musicians
John Medeski – piano, clavinet, synthesizers
Daniel Sedownick – percussion
Steve Bernstein – horns
Stan Harisson – horns
Dan Levine – horns
Chondra Sanchez – additional background vocals, voice of The All Mother
Maggie Bryngelson – additional background vocals

Artwork
Heidi Taillefer – cover art
Nathan Spoor – interior art
Bill Scoville – package design and additional graphics

Charts

References

2013 albums
Coheed and Cambria albums
The Amory Wars
Science fiction concept albums
Sequel albums